Johann Tschopp (born 1 July 1982 in Sierre) is a Swiss professional mountain bike racer. He is noted as an especially good climber since he is lightweight (1.75 m, 60 kg) and his training environment is mainly mountainous. He has already a quite important record in cyclo-cross and mountain bike marathon.

Career

2012 season
In August 2012, Tschopp won the Tour of Utah's overall classification thanks to his victorious performance on the queen stage of the race, the fifth one. He got out of the bunch on the lower slopes of the last climb leading to the Snowbird ski resort, passed all the scattered breakaway riders and crossed the uphill finish with an advantage of 43 seconds on his nearest pursuer. This ride netted him the leader's jersey previously worn by  rider Christian Vande Velde. Tschopp and his teammates managed to hold on to the general classification lead on the last trial, stage 6, which was another mountainous affair, and celebrated the victory.

2013 season
Tschopp left  at the end of the 2012 season, and joined a new team from his native country, the  team for the 2013 season. In the Tour of Oman, he took the sixth place in the general classification of a field that included the likes of Chris Froome, Alberto Contador and Joaquim Rodríguez, who finished ahead of him. In Paris–Nice, Tschopp won the mountains classification jersey thanks to his participation in numerous breakaways. He had a commanding lead at 64 points, 40 points more than his closest rival.

2014 season
In November 2014 Tschopp announced that he would retire from road racing to return to mountain biking in 2015.

Career achievements

Major results

2003
2nd National Mountain Biking Championships
2nd Sierre–Loye
3rd National Cyclo-Cross Championships
2005
2nd Overall Tour of Austria
2007
 5th Overall Tour de l'Ain
2009
 5th Overall Tropicale Amissa Bongo
1st Stage 4
 5th Overall Tour de Langkawi
2010
 1st Stage 20 Giro d'Italia
Cima Coppi
2012
 1st Overall Tour of Utah
1st Stage 5
 3rd Overall Paris–Corrèze
2013
 1st  Mountains classification Paris–Nice
 2nd Trofeo Matteotti
 6th Overall Tour of Oman
 9th Overall Critérium International
 9th Overall Tour of Norway
2014
 1st  Mountains classification Tour de Romandie
 8th Overall Bayern-Rundfahrt
 9th Overall Tour of Oman

Grand Tour general classification results timeline

References

External links

Johan Tschopp's profile on Cycling Base 

Cyclo-cross cyclists
Swiss male cyclists
1982 births
Living people
Swiss Giro d'Italia stage winners
People from Sierre
Sportspeople from Valais